Bristol Academy may refer to

Education
 Bristol Academy of Sport, based at Filton College in north Bristol
 Bristol Brunel Academy, a school in Speedwell, Bristol
 The City Academy Bristol, a school in Easton, Bristol
Sport
 Bristol Academy W.F.C., a women's football team based at the Bristol Academy of Sport
Entertainment
 O2 Academy Bristol, a music venue in the centre of Bristol